Eupithecia rubristigma is a moth in the family Geometridae. It is found in Ethiopia and Kenya.

The larvae feed on Acacia xanthophloea.

References

Moths described in 1932
rubristigma
Moths of Africa